The Vancouver Metropolitan Orchestra (VMO) is a professional training orchestra based in the Lower Mainland area of Vancouver, British Columbia, Canada. The VMO is a registered not-for-profit charitable organization, and was founded in 2003.

VMO performs music from the Baroque, Classical, and Romantic periods. Contemporary and popular music is also performed, in concerts with opera companies, choirs, and traditional folk music groups.

Kenneth Hsieh has been the music director since the orchestra's founding, and is the principal conductor.

References

External links

Musical groups established in 2003
Musical groups from Vancouver
Canadian orchestras
2003 establishments in British Columbia